Kamleshwar Patel is an Indian politician and a member of the Indian National Congress party.

Kamleshwar Patel was elected from the Sihawal Vidhan Sabha constituency for the first time in the year 2013 and retained the seat in 2018 elections. His father, Indrajeet Kumar, was a member of Indian National Congress party and also cabinet minister in state Govt of Madhya Pradesh. He was elected from the Sihawal Vidhan Sabha constituency for the first time in the year 2013 and retained the seat in 2018 elections. Kamleshwar Patel was minister of Panchayat and Rural Development in Madhya Pradesh government.

Political career
•  Cabinet  Minister (Panchayat and Rural Development) from December 2018 to March 2020.

• Became an MLA for the first time in 2013 to 2018 & in 2018 was reelected (Sihawal -Sidhi).

Legal matters
The MP High Court had ordered the police to order an FIR against Kamleshwar Patel for forgery in the medical form filled by him as he was unable to turn up for the court session. The case has been solved.

See also
Madhya Pradesh Legislative Assembly
2013 Madhya Pradesh Legislative Assembly election
Sihawal (Vidhan Sabha constituency)
Indian National Congress

References

External links
 Kamleshwar Patel (personal)

Social Account
 Twitter (Official)

Madhya Pradesh MLAs 2013–2018
Madhya Pradesh MLAs 2018–2023
Indian National Congress politicians from Madhya Pradesh
1974 births
Living people